The Olympus Stylus 410, also known as μ("mju") 410D in some markets, is a 4.0 megapixel compact digital camera.

References

Stylus 410
Cameras introduced in 2004